This is a list of Supertaça Cândido de Oliveira winning football managers. 

Five men have won the tournament both as a player and as a manager, namely António Oliveira, Manuel Fernandes, Rui Barros, Paulo Bento, Sérgio Conceição and Rúben Amorim.

Winning managers

Managers with multiple titles

By nationality

See also
 List of Taça de Portugal winning managers
 List of Taça da Liga winning managers

References

winning managers
Supertaça Cândido de Oliveira